The Monster (originally titled There Are Monsters) is a 2016 American monster horror film written and directed by Bryan Bertino, and starring Zoe Kazan and Ella Ballentine. The film was released through DirecTV Cinema on October 6, 2016, before opening in a limited release on November 11, 2016, via A24. Its plot follows a troubled mother and her adolescent daughter who find themselves stranded at night on a country road with a malicious creature hunting them.

Plot
Kathy (Zoe Kazan) is driving her teenage daughter Lizzy (Ella Ballentine) to her father's house as it's his turn for custody. Tired of taking care of her abusive, unstable, alcoholic mother, Lizzy makes it clear she wants to live with her father permanently. As night falls, Kathy hits a wolf with her car. But its injuries look like they were sustained by an animal attack rather than their car. Kathy is injured in the collision, forcing Lizzy to call a tow truck and ambulance.

The tow truck arrives and its driver, Jesse, begins working underneath the car. Lizzy notices the wolf's body is gone and now becomes frightened. Tired with bickering, Kathy gets out of the car to talk to Jesse but cannot find him. Jesse's severed arm abruptly lands on the hood of the car. A severely mauled Jesse crawls out of the woods, only for a monstrous creature to drag him under the tow truck and eat him before Kathy can help.

Attracted by the sound of music emanating from Lizzy's teddy bear, the monster drags Kathy out from the car. Luckily, it is scared away by the approaching ambulance before it is able to kill Kathy. As Kathy and Lizzy cower in the ambulance, the monster slaughters the EMT team. It smashes into the ambulance when Kathy tries to drive off, causing her to swerve into the woods.

Kathy begins vomiting up blood and realizes she has internal bleeding. Now aware that the monster is scared away by bright light (and her inevitable death is coming), Kathy uses her lighter to make a torch and tells her daughter her plan. She's going to run into the woods so the monster will chase her while Lizzy escapes into the road to get help. Kathy finally admits to Lizzy she does truly love her; even more than life itself.

Under the impression Lizzy has gotten away, Kathy allows the monster to attack (and kill) her. But Lizzy, who was unwilling to leave her mother behind, chases it away with the flashlight. Upon seeing her mother die, a distraught and enraged Lizzy (now determined to avenge Kathy's death) uses a spray can from the ambulance combined with her mother's lighter to set the monster ablaze. It attempts to lunge at her with its last bits of strength while near-fatally wounded, but Lizzy beats it to death with a large stick finally killing it.

Lizzy remembers after a particularly hateful, alcohol-fueled encounter, Kathy apologized and correctly predicted Lizzy would grow up to be a better person than she was. As the sun rises, Lizzy emerges from the woods.

Cast
 Zoe Kazan as Kathy
 Ella Ballentine as Lizzy
 Aaron Douglas as Jesse
 Christine Ebadi as Leslie Williams
 Marc Hickox as John Brooks
 Scott Speedman as Roy
 Chris Webb as Monster
 Meeko as Wolf

Production

Concept
In 2014, Bryan Bertino announced that he would direct the film from a screenplay he also wrote. William Green and Aaron Ginsburg of Atlas Entertainment and Adrienne Biddle of Unbroken Pictures would serve as producers, while Richard Suckle and Sonny Mallhi would serve as executive producers.

Commenting on his aspirations writing the screenplay, Bertino stated:

Casting
Elisabeth Moss was originally announced to star in the film in May 2014. The following year, after Moss dropped out of the production, Zoe Kazan joined the cast, replacing Moss. Commenting on committing to the project, Kazan stated that she was "really captured by the story of these two people, especially of the mother really struggling against her worst behaviors to protect her child. She's not in the habit of taking very good care of her daughter and I don't think she's well equipped for motherhood. I was moved by that storyline." To get into the mindset of being a mother, Kazan asked Ballentine's mother for baby photos of her.

In August 2015, it was announced that Scott Speedman, Aaron Douglas and Ella Ballentine all joined the cast of the film. Speedman, who had previously starred in Bertino's directorial debut The Strangers (2008), was cast as Roy, Kathy's boyfriend.

Filming
Filming began in Ottawa, Ontario in the summer of 2015. Principal photography concluded on August 21, 2015. Reflecting on the shoot, Kazan stated: "We were in a very isolated situation shooting in rural Ontario, and there wasn't a lot around. [Ella Ballentine and I] were basically the only actors in the film, so we spent a tremendous amount of time together and with her mom. It wasn't all because we were just trying to bond for the movie, it was also because we enjoyed each other's company. It definitely helped that bond as did the three days of rehearsal."

Release

Theatrical distribution
In May 2015, A24 acquired U.S distribution rights to the film. In April 2016, the first image of Kazan's character was revealed. The film’s original title, There Are Monsters, was changed to The Monster in August 2016.

The film was released on the DirecTV Cinema platform on October 6, 2016. On November 11, 2016, the film was given a limited theatrical release simultaneously with its debut on other video on demand platforms.

The film screened at the Beyond Fest on October 6, 2016, the Tacoma Film Festival on October 7, 2016, and the Sitges Film Festival on October 15, 2016.

Critical response
The Monster received positive reviews from film critics.  

Manohla Dargis, in her review for The New York Times, compared the film to other horror stories about "monstrous motherhood" released for art house and multiplex crowds, saying The Monster was "cleverly pitched somewhere in between." Of the two main actresses and their roles, Dargis noted "Ms. Kazan gives her lungs a workout, and while she’s more persuasive as a scream queen than as a mother, she and Ms. Ballentine get the job done." Justin Chang of the Los Angeles Times praised Bertino's establishment of suspense, writing that he "doles out the jolts with a judicious hand. For a while, The Monster smartly keeps its teeth-snapping main attraction either on the edges of the frame or draped in shadow, distracting us instead with the sinister patter of raindrops on the windshield, or the glow of a flashlight beam...  Not least of the surprises here is that even when The Monster is trying to scare you witless, its every scene insistently reaffirms its characters’ humanity."

Brian Tallerico of RogerEbert.com praised the creature effects, likening to those in Alien, as well as Kazan's performance, which he wrote "captures the truth of the moment in which Kathy struggles. Kazan doesn’t play the symbolism of the piece. She plays a mother fighting for the life of her child and herself. It’s a committed, fearless performance in how it never betrays the reality of her dilemma. It’s not a typical performance from Kazan, but it’s a great one." The Hollywood Reporters Justin Lowe wrote that the film "reduces primal fear to its fundamental elements," praising cinematographer Julie Kirkwood’s "ominously prowling camera and sometimes deliberately murky lighting consistently amplify tension by obscuring the threat lurking just beyond the frame." Dennis Harvey of Variety commended the film's establishment of characters and its "conceptual simplicity...  sharply assembled in all departments, wringing the maximum suspense and variety out of what might have easily become a claustrophobically monotonous handful of outdoor and car-interior locations."

Home media
The film was released on Blu-ray and DVD on January 24, 2017.

References

External links
 
 

2016 films
2016 independent films
2016 horror films
American monster movies
American independent films
Canadian independent films
Canadian monster movies
English-language Canadian films
A24 (company) films
Films about alcoholism
Films about child abuse
Films about dysfunctional families
Films set in forests
Films scored by Tomandandy
2010s monster movies
2010s English-language films
2010s Canadian films
2010s American films